Bipasha Basu is an Indian actress who has featured in over 50 films, predominantly in Hindi language. After a successful career as a model, she made her film debut with a supporting role in Abbas–Mustan's thriller Ajnabee (2001), which won her the Filmfare Award for Best Female Debut. Basu followed this with a role in her first Telugu cinemathe action film Takkari Donga (2002). She had her first major success with the supernatural thriller Raaz (2002), which earned Basu her first Filmfare Award for Best Actress nomination. The following year, she starred opposite John Abraham in the erotic thriller Jism, in which she played a seductive wife. She received a Filmfare Award for Best Performance in a Negative Role nomination for the film. Her roles in these films established her as a sex symbol.

Basu followed this initial success with roles in a series of commercial failures, including the thrillers Aetbaar, Rudraksh, Rakht—all in 2004—and the romance Barsaat (2005). She later featured in Prakash Jha's crime drama Apaharan (2005) and the ensemble comedy No Entry (2005). The latter emerged as a financial success, grossing  at the box office, and Basu's role of an escort earned her a nomination for the Best Supporting Actress at the 51st Filmfare Awards. Basu had seven film releases in 2006. Her role as an executive at a conglomerate in Madhur Bhandarkar's drama Corporate earned her another  nomination for the Filmfare Award for Best Actress. She then portrayed a character based on Bianca in Vishal Bhardwaj's Omkara, an adaptation of the Shakespearean tragedy Othello. In Sanjay Gadhvi's action film Dhoom 2—her final release of the year—she played dual roles; it was the top-grossing Bollywood film of the year. In 2008, she collaborated with Abbas–Mustan for the second time for Race. Her performance as a troubled wife in Rituparno Ghosh's 2009 Bengali film Shob Charitro Kalponik was critically acclaimed. She then featured in the third installment of the Raaz series, entitled Raaz 3D (2012). Due to her frequent associations with horror films, she was labelled India's "horror queen" by the media.

In 2013, Basu made her Hollywood debut with the historical romance The Lovers, in which she played a Maratha warrior. The following year, she starred in the comedy Humshakals. The film received largely negative reviews, though it was a moderate commercial success. In 2015, she played conjoined twins—a first for an actress in Bollywood—in the horror film Alone. She followed it by featuring as the host of the television horror series Darr Sabko Lagta Hai that year.

Films

Television

Music videos

Notes

References

External links
 
 

Indian filmographies
Actress filmographies